Donald T. Sannella FRSE is professor of computer science in the Laboratory for Foundations of Computer Science, at the School of Informatics, University of Edinburgh, Scotland.

Sannella graduated from Yale University, University of California, Berkeley and University of Edinburgh with degrees in computer science. His research interests include: algebraic specification and formal software development, correctness of modular systems, types and functional programming, resource certification for mobile code.

Sannella is founder of the European Joint Conferences on Theory and Practice of Software, a  confederation of computer science conferences, held annually in Europe since 1998.
He is editor-in-chief of the journal Theoretical Computer Science, 
and is co-founder and CEO of Contemplate Ltd. His father is Ted Sannella.

Honours and awards 
In 2014 Sannella was elected a Fellow of the Royal Society of Edinburgh.

References

External links
 Official home page
 Personal home page
 Publications

Year of birth missing (living people)
Living people
Scottish computer scientists
Alumni of the University of Edinburgh
Academics of the University of Edinburgh
Formal methods people
Academic journal editors
Place of birth missing (living people)
Yale University alumni
University of California alumni
Fellows of the Royal Society of Edinburgh